Shakhtinsk (Şahtinsk) is a town of regional significance in Karaganda Region of central Kazakhstan. Population:

People
 Vitaliy Abramov (born 1974), football coach
 Valeria Lazinskaya (born 1993), freestyle wrestler
 Andreas Maurer (born 1970), German local politician

References

Populated places in Karaganda Region